Sonny Stitt Blows the Blues is an album by saxophonist Sonny Stitt recorded in late 1959 and released on the Verve label.

Reception
The Allmusic site awarded the album 4 stars stating "Sonny Stitt led a number of excellent record dates in 1959, especially at the end of the year... Playing alto sax throughout this album, Stitt hardly sounds like a Charlie Parker clone, something that unfortunately was a frequent claim by tin-eared critics throughout a fair portion of his career".

Track listing 
All compositions by Sonny Stitt except as indicated
 "Blue Devil Blues" - 4:28   
 "Home Free Blues" - 4:23   
 "Blue Prelude" - 3:07   
 "Frankie and Johnny" (Hughie Cannon) - 5:31   
 "The Birth of the Blues" (Ray Henderson, Buddy DeSylva, Lew Brown) - 5:57   
 "A Blues Offering" - 4:06   
 "Hymnal Blues" - 6:10   
 "Morning After Blues" - 2:59  
Recorded in Los Angeles, California on December 21 (tracks 1 & 6) and December 22 (tracks 2-5, 7 & 8), 1959

Personnel 
Sonny Stitt - alto saxophone
Lou Levy - piano
Leroy Vinnegar - bass
Mel Lewis - drums
Technical
Merle Shore - art direction
Phil Stern - cover photography

References 

1960 albums
Verve Records albums
Sonny Stitt albums